Alexandre Chassang, born November 22, 1994 in Châtenay-Malabry in the Hauts-de-Seine, is a French basketball player.

Biography

Early years 
Chassang started playing basketball in the Wissous club. He played for the Evry club and took part in the French championship. He was scouted at the regional level, and joined the Centre Fédéral de Basket-ball of the INSEP in 2010.

Career 
Chassang is part of the teams of ASVEL Basket team (2012–2016), Hyères Toulon Var Basket (2016–2018), and SLUC Nancy Basket (in the Pro B, for the 2017–2018 playoffs), before playing since 2018 at Jeanne d'Arc Dijon Basket. In these three teams, he participates in the French basketball championship (Pro A). In May 2020, while he had one season left in Burgundy, he re-signed until June 2022. However, he activates his exit clause at the end of the 2020-2021 season to try a first experience abroad. On August 14, 2021, he signed with Yalovaspor Basketbol, which was recently promoted to the Turkish first division. After six weeks in Turkey and only one game played, he decided to join for the JL Bourg for the 2021–2022 season, which was in search of a player after the departure of Tyler Stone at the beginning of the season.

International career 
Chassang participated in the U16, U18 and U20 European Championships. He was a substitute for the French team for two qualifying matches for the 2019 World Cup, following the injury of Alain Koffi. His debut was against the Czech Republic national team.

References 

1994 births
French men's basketball players
Living people
People from Châtenay-Malabry